The First Council of Nicaea was a council of Christian bishops convened in the Bithynian city of Nicaea (now İznik, Turkey) by the Roman Emperor Constantine I in AD 325.

This ecumenical council was the first effort to attain consensus in the church through an assembly representing all Christendom. Hosius of Corduba may have presided over its deliberations. Its main accomplishments were settlement of the Christological issue of the divine nature of God the Son and his relationship to God the Father, the construction of the first part of the Nicene Creed, mandating uniform observance of the date of Easter, and promulgation of early canon law.

Overview 
The First Council of Nicaea was the first ecumenical council of the church. Most significantly, it resulted in the first uniform Christian doctrine, called the Nicene Creed. With the creation of the creed, a precedent was established for subsequent local and regional councils of bishops (synods) to create statements of belief and canons of doctrinal orthodoxy—the intent being to define unity of beliefs for the whole of Christendom.

Derived from Greek, "ecumenical" means "worldwide" but generally is assumed to be limited to the known inhabited Earth, and at this time in history is nearly synonymous with the Roman Empire; the earliest extant uses of the term for a council are Eusebius' Life of Constantine around 338, which states "he convoked an ecumenical council" and a letter in 382 to Pope Damasus I and the Latin bishops from the First Council of Constantinople.

One purpose of the Council was to resolve disagreements arising from within the Church of Alexandria over the nature of Jesus in his relationship to the Father: in particular, whether the Son had been 'begotten' by the Father from his own being, and therefore having no beginning, or else created out of nothing, and therefore having a beginning. St. Alexander of Alexandria and Athanasius took the first position; the popular presbyter Arius, from whom the term Arianism comes, took the second. The Council decided against the Arians overwhelmingly (of the estimated 250–318 attendees, all but two agreed to sign the creed, and these two, along with Arius, were banished to Illyria).
Another result of the Council was an agreement on when to celebrate Easter, the most important feast of the ecclesiastical calendar, decreed in an epistle to the Church of Alexandria in which is simply stated:We also send you the good news of the settlement concerning the holy pasch, namely that in answer to your prayers this question also has been resolved. All the brethren in the East who have hitherto followed the Jewish practice will henceforth observe the custom of the Romans and of yourselves and of all of us who from ancient times have kept Easter together with you.Historically significant as the first effort to attain consensus in the church through an assembly representing all of Christendom, the Council was the first occasion where the technical aspects of Christology were discussed. Through it a precedent was set for subsequent general councils to adopt creeds and canons. This Council is generally considered the beginning of the period of the First seven ecumenical councils in the history of Christianity.

Character and purpose 

The First Council of Nicaea, the first general council in the history of the Church, was convened by the Roman Emperor Constantine the Great upon the recommendations of a synod led by Bishop Hosius of Corduba in the Eastertide of 325, or rather convened by Hosius and supported by Constantine. This synod had been charged with investigation of the trouble brought about by the Arian controversy in the Greek-speaking east. To most bishops, the teachings of Arius were heretical and dangerous to the salvation of souls. In the summer of 325, the bishops of all provinces were summoned to Nicaea, a place reasonably accessible to many delegates. According to Warren H. Carroll, in the Council of Nicaea, "the Church had taken her first great step to define revealed doctrine more precisely in response to a challenge from a heretical theology."

Attendees 
Constantine had invited all 1,800 bishops of the Christian church within the Roman Empire (about 1,000 in the East and 800 in the West), but a smaller and unknown number attended. Eusebius of Caesarea counted more than 250, Athanasius of Alexandria counted 318, and Eustathius of Antioch estimated "about 270" (all three were present at the Council). Later, Socrates Scholasticus recorded more than 300, and Evagrius, Hilary of Poitiers, Jerome, Dionysius Exiguus, and Rufinus each recorded 318. This number 318 is preserved in the liturgies of the Eastern Orthodox Church and the Coptic Orthodox Church. For some, the number is suspicious as it is the number of Abraham's servants in Genesis 14:14, and there was a polemical reason for the Nicene Fathers to imply that they were servants of Abraham, the father of the Faith.

Delegates came from every region of the Roman Empire and from the Christian churches extant within the Sassanid Empire. The participating bishops were given free travel to and from their episcopal sees to the Council, as well as lodging. These bishops did not travel alone; each one had permission to bring with him two priests and three deacons, so the total number of attendees could have been above 1,800. Eusebius speaks of an almost innumerable host of accompanying priests, deacons, and acolytes. A Syriac manuscript lists the names of the eastern bishops which included 22 from Coele-Syria, 19 from Syria Palaestina, 10 from Phoenicia, 6 from Arabia, others from Assyria, Mesopotamia, Persia, etc., but the distinction of bishops from presbyters had not yet formed.

The Eastern bishops formed the great majority. Of these, the first rank was held by the patriarchs: Alexander of Alexandria and Eustathius of Antioch. Many of the assembled fathers—for instance, Paphnutius of Thebes, Potamon of Heraclea, and Paul of Neocaesarea—had stood forth as confessors of the faith and came to the Council with the marks of persecution on their faces. This position is supported by patristic scholar Timothy Barnes in his book Constantine and Eusebius. Historically, the influence of these marred confessors has been seen as substantial, but recent scholarship has called this into question.

Other remarkable attendees were Eusebius of Nicomedia; Eusebius of Caesarea, the purported first church historian; circumstances suggest that Nicholas of Myra attended (his life was the seed of the Santa Claus legends); Macarius of Jerusalem, later a staunch defender of Athanasius; Aristaces of Armenia (son of Saint Gregory the Illuminator); Leontius of Caesarea; Jacob of Nisibis, a former hermit; Hypatius of Gangra; Protogenes of Sardica; Melitius of Sebastopolis; Achilleus of Larissa (considered the Athanasius of Thessaly); and Spyridon of Trimythous, who even while a bishop made his living as a shepherd. From foreign places came John, bishop of Persia and India, Theophilus, a Gothic bishop, and Stratophilus, bishop of Pitiunt in Georgia. The Latin-speaking provinces sent at least five representatives: Marcus of Calabria from Italia, Cecilian of Carthage from Africa, Hosius of Córdoba from Hispania, Nicasius of Die from Gaul, and Domnus of Sirmium from the province of the Danube. Athanasius of Alexandria, a young deacon and companion of Bishop Alexander of Alexandria, was among the assistants. Athanasius eventually spent most of his life battling against Arianism. Alexander of Constantinople, then a presbyter, was also present as representative of his aged bishop.

The supporters of Arius included Secundus of Ptolemais, Theonus of Marmarica, Zephyrius (or Zopyrus), and Dathes, all of whom hailed from the Libyan Pentapolis. Other supporters included Eusebius of Nicomedia, Paulinus of Tyrus, Actius of Lydda, Menophantus of Ephesus, and Theognus of Nicaea.

"Resplendent in purple and gold, Constantine made a ceremonial entrance at the opening of the Council, probably in early June, but respectfully seated the bishops ahead of himself." As Eusebius describes, Constantine "himself proceeded through the midst of the assembly, like some heavenly messenger of God, clothed in raiment which glittered as it were with rays of light, reflecting the glowing radiance of a purple robe, and adorned with the brilliant splendor of gold and precious stones." The emperor was present as an overseer and presider but did not cast any official vote. Constantine organized the Council along the lines of the Roman Senate. Hosius of Cordoba may have presided over its deliberations; he was probably one of the papal legates. Eusebius of Nicomedia probably gave the welcoming address.

Agenda 
The agenda of the synod included the following issues:
 With respect to the Arian question, the large portion of the Nicene Creed that is devoted to Christ (more than 80%) indicates that the main issue before the Council was about Jesus Christ; not about the Father or about the Holy Spirit. What the main issue was more exactly can be seen by comparing the condemnations at the end of the decree—reflecting Arius' views—with the council's affirmations as contained in the body of the creed:
While Arius claimed that Jesus Christ was created, the Council concluded, since He was begotten, that He was not made.
While Arius argued that Jesus Christ was created out of nothing or out of something else, the council affirmed that he was begotten out of the substance (essence) of the Father.
Since the statement in the creed that Jesus Christ is homoousion with the Father (of the same substance) does not counter any of Arius' claims, as reflected in the condemnation. The debate was not about what his substance is but out of what substance he was generated. The term homo-ousios was added only because Emperor Constantine proposed and insisted on its inclusion. Both Fortman and Erickson mention that the main issue before the council was "not the unity of the Godhead" but the Son's "full divinity".
 The date of celebration of Pascha/Easter
 The Meletian schism
 Various matters of church discipline, which resulted in twenty canons
 Organizational structure of the Church: focused on the ordering of the episcopacy
 Dignity standards for the clergy: issues of ordination at all levels and of suitability of behavior and background for clergy
 Reconciliation of the lapsed: establishing norms for public repentance and penance
 Readmission to the Church of heretics and schismatics: including issues of when reordination and/or rebaptism were to be required
 Liturgical practice: including the place of deacons and the practice of standing at prayer during liturgy

Procedure 
The Council was formally opened 20 May 325, in the central structure of the imperial palace at Nicaea, with preliminary discussions of the Arian question. Emperor Constantine arrived nearly a month later on 14 June. In these discussions, some dominant figures were Arius, with several adherents. "Some 22 of the bishops at the Council, led by Eusebius of Nicomedia, came as supporters of Arius. But when some of the more shocking passages from his writings were read, they were almost universally seen as blasphemous." Bishops Theognis of Nicaea and Maris of Chalcedon were among the initial supporters of Arius.

Eusebius of Caesarea called to mind the baptismal creed of his own diocese at Caesarea at Palestine, as a form of reconciliation. The majority of the bishops agreed. For some time, scholars thought that the original Nicene Creed was based on this statement of Eusebius. Today, most scholars think that the creed is derived from the baptismal creed of Jerusalem, as Hans Lietzmann proposes.

The orthodox bishops won approval of every one of their proposals regarding the creed. After being in session for an entire month, the Council promulgated on 19 June the original Nicene Creed. This profession of faith was adopted by all the bishops "but two from Libya who had been closely associated with Arius from the beginning". No explicit historical record of their dissent actually exists; the signatures of these bishops are simply absent from the creed. The sessions continued to deal with minor matters until 25 August.

Arian controversy 

The Arian controversy arose in Alexandria when the newly reinstated presbyter Arius began to spread doctrinal views that were contrary to those of his bishop, Alexander of Alexandria. The disputed issues centered on the natures and relationship of God (the Father) and the Son of God (Jesus). The disagreements sprang from different ideas about the Godhead and what it meant for Jesus to be God's Son. Alexander maintained that the Son was divine in just the same sense that the Father is, coeternal with the Father, else he could not be a true Son.

Arius emphasized the supremacy and uniqueness of God the Father, meaning that the Father alone is almighty and infinite, and that therefore the Father's divinity must be greater than the Son's. Arius taught that the Son had a beginning and that he possessed neither the eternity nor the true divinity of the Father, but was rather made "God" only by the Father's permission and power, and that the Son was rather the first and the most perfect of God's creatures.

The Arian discussions and debates at the Council extended from about 20 May through about 19 June. According to legendary accounts, debate became so heated that at one point, Arius was struck in the face by Nicholas of Myra, who would later be canonized. This account is almost certainly apocryphal, as Arius would not have been present in the council chamber because he was not a bishop.

Much of the debate hinged on the difference between being "born" or "created" and being "begotten". Arians saw these as essentially the same; followers of Alexander did not. The exact meaning of many of the words used in the debates at Nicaea were still unclear to speakers of other languages. Greek words like "essence", "substance", "nature", "person" bore a variety of meanings drawn from pre-Christian philosophers, which could not but entail misunderstandings until they were cleared up. The word , in particular, was initially disliked by many bishops because of its associations with Gnostics (who used it in their theology), and because their beliefs had been condemned at the 264–268 Synods of Antioch.

Arguments for Arianism 
According to surviving accounts, the presbyter Arius argued for the supremacy of God the Father, and maintained that the Son of God was created as an act of the Father's will, and therefore that the Son was a creature made by God, begotten directly of the infinite eternal God. Arius's argument was that the Son was God's first production, before all ages, the position being that the Son had a beginning, and that only the Father has no beginning. Arius argued that everything else was created through the Son. Thus, said the Arians, only the Son was directly created and begotten of God; and therefore there was a time that he had no existence. Arius believed that the Son of God was capable of his own free will of right and wrong, and that "were He in the truest sense a son, He must have come after the Father, therefore the time obviously was when He was not, and hence He was a finite being", and that he was under God the Father. Therefore, Arius insisted that the Father's divinity was greater than the Son's. The Arians appealed to Scripture, quoting biblical statements such as "the Father is greater than I" (John 14:28), and also that the Son is "firstborn of all creation" (Colossians 1:15).

Arguments against Arianism 

The opposing view stemmed from the idea that begetting the Son is itself in the nature of the Father, which is eternal. Thus, the Father was always a Father, and both Father and Son existed always together, eternally, coequally and consubstantially. The anti-Arian argument thus stated that the Logos was "eternally begotten", therefore with no beginning. Those in opposition to Arius believed that to follow the Arian view destroyed the unity of the Godhead and made the Son unequal to the Father. They insisted that such a view was in contravention of such Scriptures as "I and the Father are one" (John 10:30) and "the Word was God" (John 1:1), as such verses were interpreted. They declared, as did Athanasius, that the Son had no beginning but had an "eternal derivation" from the Father and therefore was coeternal with him and equal to God in all aspects.

Result of the debate 

The Council declared that the Son was true God, coeternal with the Father and begotten from his same substance, arguing that such a doctrine best codified the Scriptural presentation of the Son as well as traditional Christian belief about him handed down from the Apostles. This belief was expressed by the bishops in the Creed of Nicaea, which would form the basis of what has since been known as the Niceno-Constantinopolitan Creed.

Nicene Creed 

One of the projects undertaken by the Council was the creation of a creed, a declaration and summary of the Christian faith. Several creeds were already in existence; many creeds were acceptable to the members of the Council, including Arius. From earliest times, various creeds served as a means of identification for Christians, as a means of inclusion and recognition, especially at baptism. In Rome, for example, the Apostles' Creed was popular, especially for use in Lent and the Easter season. In the Council of Nicaea, one specific creed was used to define the Church's faith clearly, to include those who professed it, and to exclude those who did not.

The original Nicene Creed read as follows:

Some distinctive elements in the Nicene Creed, perhaps from the hand of Hosius of Cordova, were added, some specifically to counter the Arian point of view.

 Jesus Christ is described as "Light from Light, true God from true God", proclaiming his divinity.
 Jesus Christ is said to be "begotten, not made", asserting that he was not a mere creature, brought into being out of nothing, but the true Son of God, brought into being "from the substance of the Father".
 He is said to be "of one substance with the Father", proclaiming that although Jesus Christ is "true God" and God the Father is also "true God", they are "of one substance". The Greek term homoousios, consubstantial (i.e. of the same substance) is ascribed by Eusebius of Caesarea to Constantine who, on this particular point, may have chosen to exercise his authority. The significance of this clause, however, is ambiguous as to the extent in which Jesus Christ and God the Father are "of one substance", and the issues it raised would be seriously controverted in the future.

At the end of the creed came a list of anathemas, designed to repudiate explicitly the Arians' stated claims.

 The view that "there was once when he was not" was rejected to maintain the coeternity of the Son with the Father.
 The view that he was "mutable or subject to change" was rejected to maintain that the Son just like the Father was beyond any form of weakness or corruptibility, and most importantly that he could not fall away from absolute moral perfection.

Thus, instead of a baptismal creed acceptable to both the Arians and their opponents, the Council promulgated one which was clearly opposed to Arianism and incompatible with the distinctive core of their beliefs. The text of this profession of faith is preserved in a letter of Eusebius to his congregation, in Athanasius' works, and elsewhere. Although the most vocal of anti-Arians, the Homoousians (from the Koine Greek word translated as "of same substance" which was condemned at the Council of Antioch in 264–268) were in the minority, the creed was accepted by the Council.

Bishop Hosius of Cordova, one of the firm Homoousians, may well have helped bring the Council to consensus. At the time of the Council, he was the confidant of the emperor in all Church matters. Hosius stands at the head of the lists of bishops, and Athanasius ascribes to him the actual formulation of the creed. Leaders such as Eustathius of Antioch, Alexander of Alexandria, Athanasius, and Marcellus of Ancyra all adhered to the Homoousian position.

In spite of his sympathy for Arius, Eusebius of Caesarea adhered to the decisions of the Council, accepting the entire creed. The initial number of bishops supporting Arius was small perhaps only around 18. After a month of discussion, on 19 June, there were only two left: Theonas of Marmarica in Libya and Secundus of Ptolemais. Maris of Chalcedon, who initially supported Arianism, agreed to the whole creed but not the anathemas. Similarly, Eusebius of Nicomedia and Theognis of Nice also agreed, except for certain statements.

The emperor carried out his earlier statement: everybody who refused to endorse the creed would be exiled. Arius, Theonas, and Secundus refused to adhere to the creed and were thus exiled to Illyria, in addition to being excommunicated. The works of Arius were ordered to be confiscated and consigned to the flames, while his supporters were considered as "enemies of Christianity". Nevertheless, the controversy continued in various parts of the empire.

The creed was amended by the First Council of Constantinople in 381.

Separation of Easter computation from Jewish calendar 
The feast of Easter is linked to the Jewish Passover and Feast of Unleavened Bread, as Christians believe that the crucifixion and resurrection of Jesus occurred at the time of those observances. As early as Pope Sixtus I in the 2nd century, some Christians had set Easter to a Sunday in the lunar month of Nisan. To determine which lunar month was to be designated as Nisan, Christians relied on the Jewish community. By the late 3rd century some Christians began to express dissatisfaction with what they took to be the disorderly state of the Jewish calendar. They argued that contemporary Jews were identifying the wrong lunar month as the month of Nisan, choosing a month whose 14th day fell before the spring equinox.

Christians, these thinkers argued, should abandon the custom of relying on Jewish informants and instead do their own computations to determine which month should be styled Nisan, setting Easter within this independently computed, Christian Nisan, which would always locate the festival after the equinox. They justified this break with tradition by arguing that it was in fact the contemporary Jewish calendar that had broken with tradition by ignoring the equinox and that in former times the 14th of Nisan had never preceded the equinox. Others felt that the customary practice of reliance on the Jewish calendar should continue, even if the Jewish computations were in error from a Christian point of view.

The controversy between those who argued for independent computations and those who argued for continued reliance on the Jewish calendar was formally resolved by the Council, which endorsed the independent procedure that had been in use for some time at Rome and Alexandria. Easter was henceforward to be a Sunday in a lunar month chosen according to Christian criteria—in effect, a Christian Nisan—not in the month of Nisan as defined by Jews. Those who argued for continued reliance on the Jewish calendar (called "protopaschites" by later historians) were urged to come around to the majority position. That they did not all immediately do so is revealed by the existence of sermons, canons, and tracts written against the protopaschite practice in the late 4th century.

These two rules—independence of the Jewish calendar and worldwide uniformity—were the only rules for Easter explicitly laid down by the Council. No details for the computation were specified; these were worked out in practice, a process that took centuries and generated numerous controversies, some of which remain unresolved. In particular, the Council did not seem to decree that Easter must fall on Sunday.

Nor did the Council decree that Easter must never coincide with Nisan 14 (the first Day of Unleavened Bread, now commonly called "Passover") in the Hebrew calendar. By endorsing the move to independent computations, the Council had separated the Easter computation from all dependence, positive or negative, on the Jewish calendar. The "Zonaras proviso", the claim that Easter must always follow Nisan 14 in the Hebrew calendar, was not formulated until after some centuries. By that time, the accumulation of errors in the Julian solar and lunar calendars had made it the de facto state of affairs that Julian Easter always followed Hebrew Nisan 14.

Melitian schism 

The suppression of the Melitian schism, an early breakaway sect, was another important matter that came before the Council of Nicaea. Melitius, it was decided, should remain in his own city of Lycopolis in Egypt but without exercising authority or the power to ordain new clergy; he was forbidden to go into the environs of the town or to enter another diocese for the purpose of ordaining its subjects. Melitius retained his episcopal title, but the ecclesiastics ordained by him were to receive again the laying on of hands, the ordinations performed by Melitius being therefore regarded as invalid. Clergy ordained by Melitius were ordered to yield precedence to those ordained by Alexander, and they were not to do anything without the consent of Bishop Alexander.

In the event of the death of a non-Melitian bishop or ecclesiastic, the vacant see might be given to a Melitian, provided he was worthy and the popular election were ratified by Alexander. Melitius' episcopal rights and prerogatives were taken from him. These mild measures, however, were in vain; the Melitians joined the Arians and caused more dissension than ever, being among the worst enemies of Athanasius. The Melitians ultimately died out around the middle of the 5th century.

Promulgation of canon law 

The Council promulgated twenty new church laws, called canons (though the exact number is subject to debate), that is, rules of discipline. The twenty as listed in the works of Nicene and Post-Nicene Fathers are as follows:

 prohibition of self-castration for clergy
 establishment of a minimum term for catechumens (persons studying for baptism)
 prohibition of a man and a woman who have both taken vows of chastity to live together in a chaste and non-legalized partnership (the so called virgines subintroductae, who practiced syneisaktism)
 ordination of a bishop in the presence of at least three provincial bishops and confirmation by the metropolitan bishop
 provision for two provincial synods to be held annually
 confirmation of ancient customs giving jurisdiction over large regions to the bishops of Alexandria, Rome, and Antioch
 recognition of the honorary rights of the see of Jerusalem
 provision for agreement with the Novatianists, an early sect
 elders who had been ordained without sufficient examination were not to be recognized
 elders who had lapsed but had not been found out were to be deposed
 mercy was enjoined toward those who had lapsed without compulsion, even though it was recognized that they did not deserve it
 those who had left the military but later sought out to be restored to their military position were to be excommunicated; depending on the sincerity of their repentance, they could be readmitted to communion earlier
 those who were fulfilling penance could receive communion if they were dying, but if they got well again, they were to finish their penance
 catachumens who lapsed were to have three years as hearers before being allowed to become catechumens again
 bishops, presbyters, and deacons were not to wander into neighboring cities to officiate
 clergy who refused to return to their home church were to be excommunicated, and the ordinations of those who were ordained by these wandering clergy were to be considered null and void
 prohibition of usury among the clergy
 precedence of bishops and presbyters before deacons in receiving the Eucharist (Holy Communion)
 declaration of the invalidity of baptism by Paulian heretics
 prohibition of kneeling on Sundays and during the Pentecost (the fifty days commencing on Easter). Standing was the normative posture for prayer at this time, as it still is among the Eastern Christians. Kneeling was considered most appropriate to penitential prayer, as distinct from the festive nature of Eastertide and its remembrance every Sunday. The canon was designed only to ensure uniformity of practice at the designated times.

Effects 

In the short-term, the Council did not completely solve the problems it was convened to discuss, and a period of conflict and upheaval continued for some time. Constantine was succeeded by two Arian emperors in the Eastern Empire: his son, Constantius II, and Valens. Valens could not resolve the outstanding ecclesiastical issues and unsuccessfully confronted St. Basil over the Nicene Creed.

Pagan powers within the empire sought to maintain and at times re-establish paganism into the seat of the emperor (see Arbogast and Julian the Apostate). Arians and Meletians soon regained nearly all of the rights they had lost, and consequently Arianism continued to spread and be a subject of debate within the Church during the remainder of the 4th century. Almost immediately, Eusebius of Nicomedia, an Arian bishop and cousin to Constantine I, used his influence at court to sway Constantine's favor from the proto-orthodox Nicene bishops to the Arians.

Eustathius of Antioch was deposed and exiled in 330. Athanasius, who had succeeded Alexander as Bishop of Alexandria, was deposed by the First Synod of Tyre in 335, and Marcellus of Ancyra followed him in 336. Arius returned to Constantinople to be readmitted into the Church but died shortly before he could be received. Constantine died the next year, after finally receiving baptism from Arian Bishop Eusebius of Nicomedia, and "with his passing the first round in the battle after the Council of Nicaea was ended".

Role of Constantine 

Christianity had only recently been legalised in the empire, the Diocletianic Persecution having ended in 311 under Galerius. Although Galerius stopped the Persecution, Christianity was not legally protected until 313, when the emperors Constantine and Licinius agreed to what became known as the Edict of Milan, guaranteeing Christians legal protection and tolerance. However, Nicene Christianity did not become the state religion of the Roman Empire until the Edict of Thessalonica in 380. In the meantime, paganism remained legal and present in public affairs. Constantine's coinage and other official motifs, until the Council of Nicaea, had affiliated him with the pagan cult of Sol Invictus. At first, Constantine encouraged the construction of new temples and tolerated traditional sacrifices. Later in his reign, he gave orders for the pillaging and the tearing down of Roman temples.

Constantine's role regarding Nicaea was that of supreme civil leader and authority in the empire. As Emperor, the responsibility for maintaining civil order was his, and he sought that the Church be of one mind and at peace. When first informed of the unrest in Alexandria due to the Arian disputes, he was "greatly troubled" and, "rebuked" both Arius and Bishop Alexander for originating the disturbance and allowing it to become public. Aware also of "the diversity of opinion" regarding the celebration of Easter and hoping to settle both issues, he sent the "honored" Bishop Hosius of Cordova (Hispania) to form a local church council and "reconcile those who were divided". When that embassy failed, he turned to summoning a synod at Nicaea, inviting "the most eminent men of the churches in every country".

Constantine assisted in assembling the Council by arranging that travel expenses to and from the bishops' episcopal sees, as well as lodging at Nicaea, be covered out of public funds. He also provided and furnished a "great hall ... in the palace" as a place for discussion so that the attendees "should be treated with becoming dignity". In addressing the opening of the Council, he "exhorted the Bishops to unanimity and concord" and called on them to follow the Holy Scriptures with: "Let, then, all contentious disputation be discarded; and let us seek in the divinely-inspired word the solution of the questions at issue."

Thereupon, the debate about Arius and church doctrine began. "The emperor gave patient attention to the speeches of both parties" and "deferred" to the decision of the bishops. The bishops first pronounced Arius' teachings to be anathema, formulating the creed as a statement of correct doctrine. When Arius and two followers refused to agree, the bishops pronounced clerical judgement by excommunicating them from the Church. Respecting the clerical decision, and seeing the threat of continued unrest, Constantine also pronounced civil judgement, banishing them into exile. This was the beginning of the practice of using secular power to establish doctrinal orthodoxy within Christianity, an example followed by all later Christian emperors, which led to a circle of Christian violence, and of Christian resistance couched in terms of martyrdom.

Misconceptions

Biblical canon 

There is no record of any discussion of the biblical canon at the council. The development of the biblical canon was nearly complete (with exceptions known as the Antilegomena, written texts whose authenticity or value is disputed) by the time the Muratorian fragment was written. The main source of the idea that the canon was created at the Council of Nicaea seems to be Voltaire, who popularised a story that the canon was determined by placing all the competing books on an altar during the Council and then keeping the ones that did not fall off. The original source of this "fictitious anecdote" is the Synodicon Vetus, a pseudo-historical account of early Church councils from 887.

In 331, Constantine commissioned fifty Bibles for the use of the Bishop of Constantinople, but little else is known (in fact, it is not even certain whether his request was for fifty copies of the entire Old and New Testaments, only the New Testament, or merely the Gospels). Some scholars believe that this request provided motivation for canon lists. In Jerome's Prologue to Judith, he claims that the Book of Judith was "found by the Nicene Council to have been counted among the number of the Sacred Scriptures".

Trinity 
The Council of Nicaea dealt primarily with the issue of the deity of Christ. Over a century earlier the term "Trinity" ( in Greek;  in Latin) was used in the writings of Origen and Tertullian, and a general notion of a "divine three", in some sense, was expressed in the 2nd-century writings of Polycarp, Ignatius, and Justin Martyr. In Nicaea, questions regarding the Holy Spirit were left largely unaddressed until after the relationship between the Father and the Son was settled around the year 362. The doctrine in a more full-fledged form was not formulated until the Council of Constantinople in 381 and a final form formulated primarily by Gregory of Nyssa.

Constantine 
While Constantine had sought a unified church after the Council, he did not force the homoousian view of Christ's nature on the council. Constantine did not commission any Bibles at the Council. Despite Constantine's sympathetic interest in the Church, he was not baptized until some 11 or 12 years after the council, putting off baptism as long as he did so as to be absolved from as much sin as possible.

Disputed matters 

According to Protestant theologian Philip Schaff: "The Nicene fathers passed this canon not as introducing anything new, but merely as confirming an existing relation on the basis of church tradition; and that, with special reference to Alexandria, on account of the troubles existing there. Rome was named only for illustration; and Antioch and all the other eparchies or provinces were secured their admitted rights. The bishoprics of Alexandria, Rome, and Antioch were placed substantially on equal footing." Thus, according to Schaff, the Bishop of Alexandria was to have jurisdiction over the provinces of Egypt, Libya and the Pentapolis, just as the Bishop of Rome had authority "with reference to his own diocese."

However, according to Fr. James F. Loughlin, there is an alternative Catholic interpretation. It involves five different arguments "drawn respectively from the grammatical structure of the sentence, from the logical sequence of ideas, from Catholic analogy, from comparison with the process of formation of the Byzantine Patriarchate, and from the authority of the ancients" in favor of an alternative understanding of the canon. According to this interpretation, the canon shows the role the Bishop of Rome had when he, by his authority, confirmed the jurisdiction of the other patriarchs—an interpretation which is in line with the Catholic understanding of the Pope. Thus, the Bishop of Alexandria presided over Egypt, Libya and the Pentapolis, while the Bishop of Antioch "enjoyed a similar authority throughout the great diocese of Oriens," and all by the authority of the Bishop of Rome. To Loughlin, that was the only possible reason to invoke the custom of a Roman Bishop in a matter related to the two metropolitan bishops in Alexandria and Antioch.

However, Protestant and Catholic interpretations have historically assumed that some or all of the bishops identified in the canon were presiding over their own dioceses at the time of the Council—the Bishop of Rome over the Diocese of Italy, as Schaff suggested, the Bishop of Antioch over the Diocese of Oriens, as Loughlin suggested, and the Bishop of Alexandria over the Diocese of Egypt, as suggested by Karl Josef von Hefele. According to Hefele, the Council had assigned to Alexandria, "the whole (civil) Diocese of Egypt." Yet those assumptions have since been proven false. At the time of the Council, the Diocese of Egypt did exist but was known as the Diocese of Alexandria, so the Council could have assigned it to Alexandria. Antioch and Alexandria were both located within the civil Diocese of Oriens, Antioch being the chief metropolis, but neither administered the whole. Likewise, Rome and Milan were both located within the civil Diocese of Italy, Milan being the chief metropolis.

This geographic issue related to Canon 6 was highlighted by Protestant writer Timothy F. Kauffman, as a correction to the anachronism created by the assumption that each bishop was already presiding over a whole diocese at the time of the Council. According to Kauffman, since Milan and Rome were both located within the Diocese of Italy, and Antioch and Alexandria were both located within the Diocese of Oriens, a relevant and "structural congruency" between Rome and Alexandria was readily apparent to the gathered bishops: both had been made to share a diocese of which neither was the chief metropolis. Rome's jurisdiction within Italy had been defined in terms of several of the city's adjacent provinces since Diocletian's reordering of the empire in 293, as the earliest Latin version of the canon indicates.

That provincial arrangement of Roman and Milanese jurisdiction within Italy therefore was a relevant precedent, and provided an administrative solution to the problem facing the Council—namely, how to define Alexandrian and Antiochian jurisdiction within the Diocese of Oriens. In canon 6, the Council left most of the diocese under Antioch's jurisdiction, and assigned a few provinces of the diocese to Alexandria, "since the like is customary for the Bishop of Rome also."

See also 

 Ancient church councils (pre-ecumenical) – church councils before the First Council of Nicaea

References

Bibliography

Primary sources 
Note: NPNF2 = , see also Nicene and Post-Nicene Fathers

Secondary sources

Further reading

The Road to Nicaea A descriptive overview of the events of the Council, by John Anthony McGuckin.

External links 
 Canons of the Council of Nicaea, Wisconsin Lutheran College
 Updated English Translations of the Creed, Rulings (Canons), and Letters Connected to the Council.

Nicaea 1
320s in the Roman Empire
Nicaea 1
Trinitarianism
Arianism
Constantine the Great and Christianity
Roman Bithynia
Nicaea
325
Easter date
Nature of Jesus Christ